Same-sex marriage in Arkansas has been legal since the U.S. Supreme Court's landmark decision in Obergefell v. Hodges on June 26, 2015, in which the court struck down same-sex marriage bans nationwide. Prior to this, same-sex marriage in Arkansas was briefly legal for a period beginning on May 9, 2014, as a result of a ruling by Sixth Judicial Circuit Judge Chris Piazza striking down the state's constitutional and statutory bans on same-sex marriage as violating the U.S. Constitution. Approximately 541 same-sex couples received marriage licenses in several counties before the Arkansas Supreme Court stayed his ruling pending appeal on May 16, 2014.

On November 25, 2014, a federal district court struck down Arkansas's ban on same-sex marriage. The judge stayed her ruling in Jernigan v. Crane pending appeal. After the Obergefell ruling, same-sex couples began obtaining marriage licenses in Arkansas beginning on June 26, 2015.

Legal history

Statute
In 1997, the Arkansas General Assembly passed a statute banning same-sex marriage and the recognition of same-sex marriages performed out of state. The bill was signed into law by Governor Mike Huckabee.

Constitution
On November 2, 2004, Arkansas voters approved Amendment 3, a state-initiated constitutional amendment that prohibited the recognition of same-sex marriage, as well as anything "identical or substantially similar to marital status" in the state of Arkansas.

On June 27, 2013, a day after the U.S. Supreme Court ruling in United States v. Windsor, Arkansans for Equality submitted proposed language for a 2014 ballot measure that would repeal the state's constitutional ban on same-sex marriage. On July 9, 2013, a different group, the Arkansas Initiative for Marriage Equality (AIME), which was formed in November 2012, submitted to the Arkansas Attorney General proposed language for the Arkansas Marriage Equality Amendment, a similar ballot measure but instead for the 2016 ballot. 
Attorney General Dustin McDaniel rejected the proposal for the 2014 ballot on July 12 and again on August 12, and the proposal for the 2016 ballot on September 18 and October 7, each time citing problems with the wording. On September 19, he accepted the proposal for the 2014 ballot and on November 7, he accepted the one for the 2016 ballot. Both initiatives, however, were not put on the ballot.

Lawsuits

Wright v. Arkansas

On July 2, 2013, eleven same-sex couples, some of whom had married in Iowa and some of whom were registered as domestic partners in Eureka Springs, filed a lawsuit in state court challenging the Arkansas Constitution's ban on same-sex marriage. On May 9, 2014, Judge Chris Piazza struck down the constitutional ban and did not stay his ruling. The Arkansas Supreme Court refused to issue a stay because Piazza's ruling was preliminary, and some counties issued marriage licenses to same-sex couples. Judge Piazza clarified his order to enjoin enforcement of state statutes as well, freeing county clerks from statutory restrictions on issuing licenses to same-sex couples. More counties issued licenses.

On May 16, 2014, the state Supreme Court stayed Piazza's ruling pending appeal. On October 7, the original plaintiffs filed a petition for summary judgment citing actions by the U.S. Supreme Court the day before and asked for expedited consideration, which the court granted. The court heard oral arguments on November 20. In an unprecedented move, the Supreme Court did not rule before the close of its term in 2014. Instead, two new justices ended up joining the court after two justices had their terms end, causing the justices to question who should participate. The court never issued an opinion before Obergefell was decided, mooting Wright. On November 11, 2015, former Justice Donald L. Corbin, one of the original justices to hear the case, revealed that the court had voted 5–2 to strike down the same-sex marriage ban in 2014. Corbin said he had written a majority opinion finding that Arkansas' ban on same-sex marriage violated both the Arkansas and U.S. constitutions. Corbin urged the other justices to issue the opinion before the end of his term in 2014, but for unstated reasons, the ruling was never issued. Instead, the court waited for the Supreme Court to decide another case on the same issue, and dismissed Wright as moot.

Jernigan v. Crane
On July 15, 2013, two lesbian couples filed a federal same-sex marriage lawsuit, Jernigan v. Crane, in the U.S. District Court for the Eastern District of Arkansas. One plaintiff couple sought a marriage license from Arkansas, while another couple asked to have their New York marriage recognized. The lead named defendant was the Pulaski County clerk, being sued in his official capacity for denying marriage licenses, with the other defendants being Governor Mike Beebe and Attorney General McDaniel. On January 31, 2014, the county and state defendants filed a motion to dismiss the suit. On July 16, 2014, the plaintiffs filed a motion for summary judgment. Judge Kristine Baker heard oral arguments on November 20. 

On November 25, Baker ruled for the plaintiffs and stayed her ruling pending appeal. Judge Baker found that the state's ban on same-sex marriage violated the plaintiffs' fundamental right to marry, requiring justification under the strict scrutiny standard. She also ruled that a ban on same-sex marriage is a form of sex discrimination, which is therefore reviewed under the standard known as heightened scrutiny. She rejected the plaintiffs' contention that the ban violated their right to travel and that it constituted discrimination on the basis of sexual orientation. Attorney General McDaniel said that before deciding whether to appeal the decision he would confer with Leslie Rutledge, who was due to succeed him as attorney general in January 2015. The state filed a notice of appeal in the Eighth Circuit on December 23. The Eighth Circuit dismissed the appeal and affirmed the district court's decision on August 11, 2015.

Frazier-Henson v. Walther
On February 13, 2015, two same-sex couples in "window marriages", married in May 2014 while a state court's order enjoining enforcement of the state's same-sex marriage ban was in force, brought suit in state court seeking to require the state to recognize their marriages. They named three state officials as defendants. They asked the court to rule on behalf of all same-sex couples married in May. State Judge Wendell Griffen ruled on June 9, 2015 that the 541 same-sex marriages conducted between May 9 and May 16 were valid.

Obergefell v. Hodges
On June 26, 2015, the U.S. Supreme Court ruled in Obergefell v. Hodges that same-sex marriage bans violate the Due Process and Equal Protection clauses of the Fourteenth Amendment. The decision legalized same-sex marriage nationwide in the United States, including in Arkansas. Immediately following the ruling, same-sex couples began obtaining marriage licenses in Arkansas. All counties in the state announced their intention to comply, expect Cleburne, Van Buren and Yell counties which refused to issue marriage licenses to same-sex couples until relenting on June 29.

Governor Asa Hutchinson responded to the ruling by stating, "Today the Supreme Court in a 5-4 decision requires the State of Arkansas to recognize same-sex marriage. This decision goes against the expressed view of Arkansans and my personal beliefs and convictions. While my personal convictions will not change, as Governor I recognize the responsibility of the state to follow the direction of the U.S. Supreme Court. As a result of this ruling, I will direct all state agencies to comply with the decision." Attorney General Rutledge said she was "disappointed" but "[t]he justices have issued a decision, and that decision must be followed." Rutledge instructed state agencies and county clerks to comply with the Supreme Court ruling. State tax authorities began allowing married same-sex couples to submit joint tax returns, and government employers that allow spouses of married employees to enroll in employee benefits programs, such as health insurance, began allowing the same-sex spouses of employees to enroll as well. County clerks began issuing marriage licenses to all couples regardless of gender.

Developments after legalization
On February 2, 2017, a resolution calling on the United States Congress to pass a federal constitutional amendment banning same-sex marriage was introduced to the Arkansas General Assembly. It was sponsored by 21 lawmakers, all members of the Republican Party. On February 20, the Arkansas Senate rejected the resolution in a 17–7 vote. The resolution needed 18 votes to pass and thus failed by one vote. However, that same day, the vote was expunged and the Senate re-voted on February 28; this time passing it by 18 votes to 9. On March 8, a House subcommittee recommended the Arkansas House of Representatives to approve the resolution. On March 14, the House rejected it in a 29–41 vote. Of those who voted in favor, all 29 were Republicans. Of those who voted against, 20 were Democrats and 21 were Republicans.

On March 6, 2017, Representative Stephen Meeks introduced a bill to the General Assembly to reenact the state's same-sex marriage ban. The bill would have thus been in violation of Obergefell v. Hodges and the U.S. Constitution. It was withdrawn by Meeks on March 14.

Demographics and marriage statistics
Data from the 2000 U.S. census showed that 4,423 same-sex couples were living in Arkansas. By 2005, this had increased to 5,890 couples, likely attributed to same-sex couples' growing willingness to disclose their partnerships on government surveys. Same-sex couples lived in all counties of the state, and constituted 0.7% of coupled households and 0.4% of all households in the state. Most couples lived in Pulaski, Washington and Benton counties, but the counties with the highest percentage of same-sex couples were Carroll (0.77% of all county households) and Madison (0.59%). Same-sex partners in Arkansas were on average younger than opposite-sex partners, and more likely to be employed. However, the average and median household incomes of same-sex couples were lower than different-sex couples, and same-sex couples were also far less likely to own a home than opposite-sex partners. 30% of same-sex couples in Arkansas were raising children under the age of 18, with an estimated 2,778 children living in households headed by same-sex couples in 2005.

Domestic partnerships
The small town of Eureka Springs in Carroll County is the only incorporated city in Arkansas to allow domestic partnerships (since 2007) and health care coverage for the domestic partners of city workers (since 2011). On November 12, 2012, the Eureka Springs City Council endorsed marriage for same-sex couples, becoming the first city in Arkansas to do so.

Public opinion
{| class="wikitable"
|+style="font-size:100%" | Public opinion for same-sex marriage in Arkansas
|- 
! style="width:190px;"| Poll source
! style="width:200px;"| Date(s)administered
! class=small | Samplesize
! Margin oferror
! style="width:100px;"| % support
! style="width:100px;"| % opposition
! style="width:40px;"| % no opinion
|-
| Public Religion Research Institute
| align=center| March 8–November 9, 2021
| align=center| ?
| align=center| ?
| align=center| 47%
|  align=center| 52%
| align=center| 1%
|-
| Public Religion Research Institute
| align=center| January 7–December 20, 2020
| align=center| 439 random telephoneinterviewees
| align=center| ?
|  align=center| 58%
| align=center| 37%
| align=center| 5%
|-
| Public Religion Research Institute
| align=center| April 5–December 23, 2017
| align=center| 641 random telephoneinterviewees
| align=center| ?
|  align=center| 52%
| align=center| 38%
| align=center| 10%
|-
| University of Arkansas
| align=center| October 12–22, 2017
| align=center| 801 
| align=center| ± 3.5%
| align=center| 35%
|  align=center| 57%
| align=center| 9%
|-
| American Values Atlas/Public Religion Research Institute
| align=center| May 18, 2016–January 10, 2017
| align=center| 1,008 random telephoneinterviewees
| align=center| ?
| align=center| 42%
|  align=center| 50%
| align=center| 8%
|-
| University of Arkansas
| align=center| October 18–27, 2016
| align=center| 800 random telephoneinterviewees
| align=center| ± 3.5%
| align=center| 33%
|  align=center| 57%
| align=center| 10%
|-
| American Values Atlas/Public Religion Research Institute
| align=center| April 29, 2015–January 7, 2016
| align=center| 782 random telephoneinterviewees
| align=center| ?
| align=center| 37%
|  align=center| 57%
| align=center| 6%
|-
| University of Arkansas
| align=center| October 19–25, 2015
| align=center| 800 random telephoneinterviewees
| align=center| ± 3.5%
| align=center| 29%
|  align=center| 63%
| align=center| 8%
|-
| rowspan=2 colspan=1 | Edison Research
| rowspan=2 colspan=1 align=center | November 4, 2014
| rowspan=2 colspan=1 align=center | ?
| rowspan=2 colspan=1 align=center | ?
| align=center| 26%
|  align=center| 69%
| align=center| 5%
|-
| align=center| 26%
|  align=center| 69%
| align=center| 5%
|-
|align| New York Times/CBS News/YouGov
| align=center| September 20–October 1, 2014
| align=center| 1991 likely voters
| align=center| ± 2.6%
| align=center| 32%
|  align=center| 54%
| align=center| 13%
|-
| New York Times/Kaiser Family Foundation
| align=center| April 8–15, 2014
| align=center| 857 registered voters
| align=center| ?
| align=center| 35%
|  align=center| 57%
| align=center| 8%
|-
| Public Policy Polling
| align=center| April 25–27, 2014
| align=center| 840 registered voters
| align=center| ± 3.4%
| align=center| 27%
|  align=center| 63%
| align=center| 10%
|-
| Greenberg Quinlan Rosner Research/Target Point Consulting
| align=center| June 26–30, 2013
| align=center| 600 adults
| align=center| ± 4.9%
| align=center| 36%
|  align=center| 55%
| align=center| 9%
|-

See also
LGBT rights in Arkansas
Same-sex marriage in the United States

Notes

References

External links
Jernigan v. Crane, U.S. District Court for the Eastern District of Arkansas, November 25, 2014

Arkansas
LGBT rights in Arkansas
2014 in Arkansas
2015 in Arkansas
2014 in LGBT history
2015 in LGBT history